THINK Global School (TGS) is an independent high school that travels the world with students studying in ten countries, over the course of three years. The school is a non-profit, co-educational, and non-denominational. Think Global School was founded by Harald and Joann McPike.

Students at Think Global School gain an education through the Changemaker Curriculum, engaging in place- and project-based learning relevant to the countries they travel to.

Mission
The school's mission is "to challenge learners through firsthand experiences of global travel, in order to become compassionate individuals who are curious and knowledgeable about the world and motivated to affect meaningful change. To guide us on our journey and help us achieve our goals, we follow a set of core values and promises gathered from nations around the world.."

Non-profit status
The school is a U.S.-registered 501(c)(3) non-profit entity and has earned the Guidestar Exchange Seal, an award given to non-profits demonstrating a commitment to transparency.

Changemaker Curriculum

Learning at Think Global School is centered around the school's internally developed Changemaker Curriculum, which educates students through a blend of place and project-based learning. There are no formal classes at Think Global School, instead students participate in one multidisciplinary teacher-led module each term that draws heavily from social, environmental, historical, and cultural themes and create several personal projects of their own. For the teacher-led modules, students are either partnered up or work in groups to replicate what employees experience in the workforce.

Each teacher-led module and student-driven project comprises multiple learning targets, which are tied to psychologist Benjamin Bloom's theory of mastery learning. Students increase in mastery rank as they progress through modules and projects and their skills improve as well. These ranks are novice, specialist, and master.

Reporting at Think Global School is done quarterly at the end of each term. The school utilizes a narrative report to present a comprehensive picture of a student's time in country. Students evaluate their own learning outcomes as part of the narrative report as well as receiving feedback from their educators and advisors on their academic and social progress.

Think Local and service learning 
To maximize its students' time in country, Think Global School has three components: in-country service learning, cultural experiences, and learning the local language.

Service learning 
Think Global School integrates service learning into its curriculum in several ways. The first is by engaging in service-based activities in the places the school visits. Students create a project that meets a local need in their home country. These service-based projects require the student to work with stakeholders in their local community to ensure project authenticity.

Cultural experiences and weXplores 
To help develop empathy and a balanced worldview, students at Think Global School are also exposed to a wide variety of cultural experiences. These experiences are usually held in conjunction with guest speakers who are local experts in their field and often involve the students traveling to a destination to learn firsthand. These cultural experiences cover the environmental, socio-cultural, political, and economic issues that are central to the host country.

Each term students also take at least one week-long series of activities, leaving the host city for another location.

Language learning 
The school's core academic program is taught in English. Particular emphasis is placed on learning Spanish, with one term being held in a Spanish speaking country each year. Moreover, students are expected to acquire a basic vocabulary in the language of each term's host country.

References

External links 

 "Sweden to host first Think Global School trimester" By Marcus Oscarsson
 "Cameron Becomes A Citizen of the World" By The South Coast Register
 "Life-changing journey for student" By The Press
 "Hiroshima International School and Think Global School students mix it up in Multiculturalism 101" By Louise George Kittaka

Boarding schools in New York (state)
International schools in New York City
Experiential learning schools
Non-profit organizations based in New York (state)